= Grand Le Pierre Formation =

- Stratigraphic range: 575– 538.8 Ma Ediacaran
- Type: Formation
- Unit of: Long Harbour Group

Lithology
- Primary: Felsic volcanics

Location
- Region: Newfoundland
- Country: Canada
- Occurrence of the Grand Le Pierre Formation in southeastern Newfoundland

The Grand Le Pierre Formation is a formation cropping out in Newfoundland.
